The Terrell County School District is a public school district in Terrell County, Georgia, United States, based in Dawson. It serves the communities of Bronwood, Dawson, Parrott, and Sasser.

Schools
The Terrell County School District has one primary school, one elementary school, one middle school and one high school.

Primary school
Lillie Cooper Primary School

Elementary school
Carver Elementary School

Middle school
 Terrell Middle School

High school
 Terrell High School

References

External links

School districts in Georgia (U.S. state)
Education in Terrell County, Georgia